Cecil Charles Sandford (born 21 February 1928) is a British former professional Grand Prix motorcycle road racer. He competed in the FIM motorcycle Grand Prix world championships from 1950 to 1957. Sandford is a two-time FIM road racing world champion and a two-time winner at the Isle of Man TT.

After the death of Carlo Ubbiali in 2020, Sandford is the last surviving motorcycle world champion across all classes from the 1950s.

Motorcycle racing career
Born in Blockley, Gloucestershire, Sandford began his career riding in local scramble and grass track events. In 1950 he was offered a place on the AJS factory racing team alongside the reigning world champion, Les Graham. He followed Graham to the MV Agusta team and won the 1952 FIM 125cc title, bringing Agusta their first world championship. In the 1957 season, he won a second world championship, this time in the 250 class riding for the Mondial team.

Motorcycle Grand Prix results 
Points system from 1950 to 1968

(key) (Races in italics indicate fastest lap)

References

1928 births
Living people
English motorcycle racers
500cc World Championship riders
350cc World Championship riders
250cc World Championship riders
125cc World Championship riders
Isle of Man TT riders
People from Blockley
Sportspeople from Gloucestershire
250cc World Riders' Champions
125cc World Riders' Champions